In aviation, a mid-air collision is an accident in which two or more aircraft come into unplanned contact during flight. Owing to the relatively high velocities involved and the likelihood of subsequent impact with the ground or sea, very severe damage or the total destruction of at least one of the aircraft usually results.

The potential for a mid-air collision is increased by miscommunication, mistrust, error in navigation, deviations from flight plans, lack of situational awareness, and the lack of collision-avoidance systems. Although a rare occurrence in general due to the vastness of open space available, collisions often happen near or at airports, where large volumes of aircraft are spaced more closely than in general flight.

First recorded mid-air collision

The first recorded collision between aircraft occurred at the "Milano Circuito Aereo Internazionale" meeting held between 24 September and 3 October 1910 in Milan, Italy.  On 3 October, Frenchman René Thomas, flying the Antoinette IV monoplane, collided with British Army Captain Bertram Dickson by ramming his Farman III biplane in the rear.  Both pilots survived, but Dickson was so badly injured that he never flew again.

The first fatal collision occurred over La Brayelle Airfield, Douai, France, on 19 June 1912.  Captain Marcel Dubois and Lieutenant Albert Peignan, both of the French Army, crashed into one another in an early-morning haze, killing both pilots.

Efforts to prevent collisions

TCAS 

Almost all modern large aircraft are fitted with a traffic collision avoidance system (TCAS), which is designed to try to prevent mid-air collisions. The system, based on the signals from aircraft transponders, alerts pilots if a potential collision with another aircraft is imminent. Despite its limitations, it is believed to have greatly reduced mid-air collisions.

Civilian/military mid-air collisions in the United States
On some occasions, military aircraft conducting training flights inadvertently collide with civilian aircraft. Before 1958, civilian air traffic controllers guiding civilian flights and military controllers guiding military aircraft were both unaware of the other's aircraft. The 1958 collision between United Airlines Flight 736 and a fighter jet, and another U.S. military/civilian crash one month later involving Capital Airlines Flight 300, hastened the signing of the Federal Aviation Act of 1958 into law.  The act created the Federal Aviation Agency (later renamed the Federal Aviation Administration), and provided unified control of airspace for both civil and military flights. In 2005, in an effort to reduce such military/civilian mid-air collisions in U.S. airspace, the Air National Guard Flight Safety Division, led by Lt Col Edward Vaughan, used the disruptive solutions process to create the See and Avoid web portal. In late 2006, the U.S. Defense Safety Oversight Council recognized and funded the site as its official civil/military mid-air collision prevention website, with participation by all the services.

List of notable civilian and military–civilian mid-air collisions

List of notable military mid-air collisions

See also
 2001 Japan Airlines mid-air incident – a near-miss incident between two commercial aircraft
 “ABQ”, an episode of Breaking Bad that revolves around a mid-air collision
 Automatic dependent surveillance – broadcast (ADS-B)
 Big sky theory
 Bird strike – a collision between an aircraft and an airborne animal
 Disruptive solutions process
 List of mid-air collisions and incidents in the United Kingdom
 List of UAV-related incidents – for non-fatal collisions involving manned aircraft and unmanned aerial vehicles
 Near miss (safety)
 Portable collision avoidance system (PCAS)
 Runway incursion – including a list of aircraft collisions on the ground
 Traffic collision avoidance system (TCAS)

References
Notes

Citations

Bibliography

External links
  – Tabular statistics and summaries of over 100 midair collisions in U.S. from 1948 to 1957
 Analysis of Mid-Air Collisions, One of the most hazardous consequences of a loss of separation between aircraft, including as a result of a level bust, is a mid-air collision SKYbrary
 Indepth Backgrounder: Mid-air collision, CBC